The Irish Farmers Journal is an Irish weekly newspaper.

Farmer's Journal or Farmers Journal, a commonly used title for periodicals in the realm of agriculture, may also refer to:

 Evans and Ruffy's Farmers' Journal, a British newspaper acquired by Bell's Weekly Messenger in 1832
 Farmer's Journal, a newspaper published in Quebec, Canada
 Farmer's Journal, a newspaper published in Danbury, Connecticut, U.S.(1790–1793)
Gippsland Farmers Journal (1887–1932), an Australian twice-weekly, forerunner to Traralgon Journal and Record
Jamestown Star and Farmer's Journal (1903–1946), an Australian newspaper absorbed into The Times and Northern Advertiser
Mannum Mercury and Farmer's Journal (1912–1917), an Australian newspaper absorbed into The Courier
Manufacturers and Farmer's Journal (1848–1907), a newspaper based in Providence, Rhode Island, U.S.

Small Farmer's Journal, an American quarterly magazine

The Washington Republican and Farmer's Journal, an American newspaper associated with Thomas Emmerson